The Colorado State Rams women's volleyball team represents Colorado State University, located in Fort Collins, in the U.S. state of Colorado, in NCAA Division I volleyball competition. They play their home games at the Moby Arena and are members of the Mountain West Conference.

Year-by-Year Results

References 

 
Colorado State Rams women's volleyball